The Museu das Comunicações is a technology museum in Lisbon, Portugal. The museum focuses on the History of communication

Exhibits 
The  Museum is housed in a building from the 1940s, in the riverside area of Lisbon.  It has several rooms, with varying capacities, between 10 and 160 people.

References

Museums in Lisbon
Telecommunications museums